This is a list of notable historical and modern shopping malls in Istanbul, Turkey.

Historical
 Grand Bazaar (1461), Fatih
 Egyptian Bazaar  (1660), Fatih

Modern
GLA = Gross leasable area
Akasya, Üsküdar,  GLA
 Akmerkez (1993), Etiler, Beşiktaş,  GLA
 Atirus Shopping Center (2005), Büyükçekmece,  
 Capitol Shopping Center (1993), Üsküdar, 73,000m2 GLA
 Carousel Shopping Center (1995), Bakırköy, 76,500m2 GLA
 CarrefourSA Maltepe Park (2005), Maltepe, 71,000 m2
 Cevahir Mall (2005), Şişli,  GLA
 Galleria Ataköy (1987), Bakırköy, 77,906m2 GLA
 İstinye Park (2007), İstinye, Sarıyer, 242,000 m2 GLA
 Kanyon (2006), Levent, Beşiktaş, 37,500 m2 GLA
 MetroCity AVM (2003), Levent, Beşiktaş, 52,000 m2 GLA
 Olivium Outlet Center (2000), Zeytinburnu, 29,211 m2 GLA
 Profilo Shopping Center (1998), Mecidiyeköy, Şişli
 Tepe Nautilus (2002), Acıbadem, Kadıköy, 154,332 m2 GLA
 Zorlu Center (2013), Beşiktaş, 615,882 m2 floor area including non-retail

See also
 List of shopping malls in Turkey
 Istanbul Shopping Fest

References

Shopping malls
Shopping malls, Istanbul